Briken Calja (born 19 February 1990, Elbasan) is an Albanian weightlifter, Olympian, and European Champion competing in the 69 kg category until 2018 and 73 kg starting in 2018 after the International Weightlifting Federation reorganized the categories. He won the silver medal in the men's 73 kg event at the 2021 World Weightlifting Championships held in Tashkent, Uzbekistan.

Career
Calja competed for Albania at the 2012 Summer Olympics, where he finished 9th in his weight class after lifting a total weight of 320 kg. In 2013 Calja was suspended for two years for using androsterone.

He competed at the 2016 Summer Olympics in 69kg division where he finished in 5th place after lifting 326 kg. In 2018 Calja became European champion in the 2018 European Weightlifting Championships in Bucharest.

Major results

References

External links 
 

Albanian male weightlifters
Weightlifters at the 2012 Summer Olympics
Weightlifters at the 2016 Summer Olympics
Olympic weightlifters of Albania
1990 births
Living people
Doping cases in weightlifting
Albanian sportspeople in doping cases
People from Elbasan
Mediterranean Games silver medalists for Albania
Mediterranean Games medalists in weightlifting
Competitors at the 2009 Mediterranean Games
European Weightlifting Championships medalists
Weightlifters at the 2020 Summer Olympics
European champions for Albania
World Weightlifting Championships medalists
20th-century Albanian people
21st-century Albanian people